François Ledent (born 4 July 1908, date of death unknown) was a Belgian footballer. He played in two matches for the Belgium national football team in 1928.

References

External links
 

1908 births
Year of death missing
Belgian footballers
Belgium international footballers
Place of birth missing
Association football forwards
Standard Liège players